Nakka Kahut is a village and union council, an administrative subdivision, of Chakwal District in the Punjab Province of Pakistan, it is part of Talagang Tehsil. The village gets its name from the Kahut tribe, who make up the majority of the population.

References

Union councils of Chakwal District
Populated places in Chakwal District